Proof of Age Card may refer to:

Australian state and territory issued identity photo cards
Queensland Adult proof of age card
South Australia proof of age card
Victoria Proof of age card

See also
Proof of Age Standards Scheme